Clarine is a feminine given name. Notable people with the name include:

Clarine Harp (born 1978), American voice actress
Clarine Nardi Riddle (born 1949), American lawyer
Clarine Seymour (1898–1920), American actress
Clarine Stephenson, Jamaican novelist and poet

Feminine given names